Carcinopodia schoutedeni is a moth of the  subfamily Arctiinae. It is found in the Democratic Republic of Congo.

References

Lithosiini
Insects of the Democratic Republic of the Congo
Moths of Africa
Endemic fauna of the Democratic Republic of the Congo